London South Collegiate Institute (also known as S.C.I., or simply South) is a public high school in London, Ontario, Canada, located at 371 Tecumseh Avenue East.

South is administered by the Thames Valley District School Board. Approximately 600 students attend the school in grades 9-12, which offers a co-op program.  There is also a program for gifted students called the Academy Program.

The school colours are garnet and grey and the school mascot is the lion. South is known for its academic rigour, sports teams, and the strength of its arts program, which includes drama, visual arts, music, and dance.

The South Collegiate Alumni Association, established in 1999, organizes the school's reunions and alumni events, including annual homecoming events since 2007. South is one of the only high schools in Canada to host a homecoming with football games and a tailgate party.

On May 24 to 26, 2013, South celebrated its 85th year at the Tecumseh Avenue location with a reunion.

History

The school first opened in 1922 at the corner of Askin Street and Wharncliffe Road South, where Victoria Public School now lies, with 290 students and 10 teachers. The growing school moved to its current location on  Tecumseh Avenue in June 1928, six years later.

School pride was a focus right from the early years. According to the school's website, early students recited a daily pledge: "We're here to win the day for the garnet and grey, and to London South we pledge allegiance now." The school's Latin motto, virtus repulsae nescia sordidae, means "courage will never know ignominious defeat." They are also known for the school's fight song:

Garnet and Grey, Garnet and Grey,
Knock them down and lead the way!
Hit 'em low and hit 'em high,
Fight 'em, fight 'em, SCI!
Go, South!
Fight, fight, fight!"

Renovations
In the 1995-96 school year, the school underwent comprehensive renovations which included enclosing the school's former open central courtyard into an enclosed atrium.

Between 2005 and 2007, the rubber gym floor was replaced by a new wood floor, partly due to the success of the "Roar for the Floor" fundraising campaign. An outdoor scoreboard was also installed with money raised. In the summer of 2007, the field was revamped, with new sod, a sprinkler system, new football nets, bleachers, a paved track, new fence, and several portable classrooms removed. The field renovations was paid for donations from alumnus Matt Giffen, and was named - in memory of his father - the James A. Giffen Memorial Field.

Notable alumni
 Dan Brodbeck, record producer
 Charles "Chuck" Dalton, Olympic basketball player
 Brett Dier, actor
 Chris Doty, filmmaker, journalist
 Robert Ford, diplomat, poet
 Ray Getliffe, former NHL hockey player, Montreal Canadiens
 Shuman Ghosemajumder, Google executive, entrepreneur
 John Glassford, CFL football player, Ottawa Rough Riders
 Dennis Goulden, Emmy Award-winning producer
 Dianne Haskett, former mayor, London, Ontario
 Alex Pierzchalski, CFL football player, Saskatchewan Roughriders
 Vaughn Martin, NFL football player, Kansas City Chiefs
 Kate Nelligan, Oscar-nominated actress, The Prince of Tides
 Walter Stewart, journalist

Notable faculty
 John Krisak, co-founder, Canadian Lyceum of Greece, English, 1980s-90s
 Marion Woodman, Jungian psychologist, English, 1950s-70s
 Welwyn Wilton Katz, children's author, Mathematics, 1970s
 Lesley Thompson, Olympic athlete

See also
List of high schools in Ontario

References

External links

 Official site
 South Collegiate Alumni Association

High schools in London, Ontario
Educational institutions established in 1922
1922 establishments in Ontario